The 1983 Tipperary Senior Hurling Championship was the 93rd staging of the Tipperary Senior Hurling Championship since its establishment by the Tipperary County Board in 1887.

Moycarkey-Borris were the defending champions.

On 30 October 1983, Borris-Ileigh won the championship after a 0-17 to 1-11 defeat of Loughmore-Castleiney in the final at Leahy Park. It was their fifth championship title overall and their first title since 1981.

Results

Quarter-finals

Semi-finals

Final

Championship statistics

Top scorers

Overall

In a single game

References

Tipperary
Tipperary Senior Hurling Championship